The Immaculate Conception Cathedral Parish, commonly referred to as Boac Cathedral, is a Roman Catholic church and cathedral in the town center of Boac, Marinduque, in the Mimaropa region of the Philippines.

The seat of the Diocese of Boac, the cathedral today is surrounded by its likewise centuries-old defensive walls, and was declared a Philippine Important Cultural Property (ICP) in 2018 by the national museum of the country.At present, the Cathedral houses the Sacred Heart Pastoral Center (Bishop's residence) as well as the Diocesan Shrine of Mahal na Birhen ng Biglang Awa within its compound.

In 2021, the cathedral was designated as a jubilee church of the Diocese of Boac during the celebration of the 500 Years of Christianity in the Philippines.

History
A Franciscan missionary, Fray Estevan Ortiz, planted the first cross on Marinduque island in 1579. Monserrat de Marinduque, the first visita, (now Boac), was established with Fray Alonzo Banol as its minister a year later in 1580.

The Franciscans ceded the administration of the island in 1618 to the Archbishop of Manila, Miguel García Serrano, who then entrusted the island to the Society of Jesus. In 1621, the Jesuits assumed the spiritual administration of the island. The church was constructed facing east with its rear overlooking the lower town, called labak by the natives, in 1756. It was seen to serve as a refuge of the townspeople against pirate attacks prevalent in the era, in addition to its purpose as a place for worship when it was finally built in 1792.

Local accounts include that once, when the townspeople were being attacked by Moro pirates, while taking refuge within the church's walls, they prayed fervently to their patroness, the Immaculate Conception, for salvation from the attack. Oral tradition also holds that while the natives were being killed, they are all praying when a supposed apparition of Mary with outstretched hands drove away the intruders. This event led to the devotion to Mahal na Birhen ng Biglang Awa (Our Lady of Prompt Succor) as their patroness's new title.

In 1899, the flag for the revolution in the Philippines brought by Canuto Vargas was blessed in the cathedral. in 1958, the venerated image of Mahal na Birhen ng Biglang Awa was canonically crowned and is considered as the patroness of the province. The historical marker installed at the cathedral states that a Boac parish priest named Saturnino Trinidad helped Colonel Maximo Abad surrender to the Americans under H.H. Bandholtz.

Clergy 

Parish Priest: Rev. Fr. Ian Retardo

Parochial Vicars: Rev. Fr. Rotheto Amodia, Rev Fr. Fabio Fiegalan, Rev Fr. Reynel Sajul

Resident Priests: Rev. Fr. Bienvenido Marticio, Rev. Fr. Isagani Milambiling

References

External links
 Facebook page 

 Diocese of Boac Clergy 

Buildings and structures in Marinduque
Marked Historical Structures of the Philippines
Spanish Colonial architecture in the Philippines
Roman Catholic cathedrals in the Philippines
1792 establishments in the Spanish Empire
18th-century Roman Catholic church buildings in the Philippines
19th-century Roman Catholic church buildings in the Philippines
Fortified church buildings